B. Radhabai Ananda Rao was member of Indian Parliament.

She was born at Venkatapuram village in Khammam district on 2 February 1930. She was educated at Rajahmundry Tutorial College and Rajahmundry Teachers' Training School, Rajahmundry.

She was elected from Bhadrachalam (Lok Sabha constituency) as a member of Indian National Congress for the 4th Lok Sabha in 1967 and also the four successive times until 1985.

She married B. K. Ananda Rao on 6 June 1952; they had a son and two daughters.  She is an Agriculturist and worked as family planning instructor in Singareni Collieries between 1957 and 1967. She was Member of Indian National Trade Union Congress, 1962–64 and  Parents' Association, Zila Parishad High School, Ramavaram and Member, Panchayat Samiti, Kothagudem, 1957.  She took active part in propagating Family Planning schemes in Singareni Collieries and other tribal areas and also worked for the welfare of the tribal people.

She was Member, Committee on Government Assurances and intensively toured foreign countries in a parliamentary delegation.

External links
 Official biographical sketch in Parliament of India website

Telugu politicians
1930 births
India MPs 1967–1970
India MPs 1971–1977
India MPs 1977–1979
India MPs 1980–1984
Indian National Congress politicians from Andhra Pradesh
Living people
Women in Andhra Pradesh politics
People from Khammam district
Lok Sabha members from Andhra Pradesh
20th-century Indian women politicians
20th-century Indian politicians
Women members of the Lok Sabha